
Bachelor Lake is a lake in Brown County, Minnesota in the northeastern part of Stark township. Covering 79.80 acres, it is an officially protected water of the State of Minnesota. The lake is within the Cottonwood River Major Watershed.

Bachelor Lake was named for an unmarried homesteader who lived in Stark Township, Brown County, Minnesota.

In the spring of 2016, the Minnesota DNR utilized Bachelor Lake as a rearing pond for walleye. Approximately 5,000 fry per littoral acre (an acre that is less than 15 feet deep) were stocked in Bachelor Lake. The fall harvest following the stocking of walleye fry produced  of fingerlings.

See also
Lakes of Minnesota
List of fishes of Minnesota

References

Citations

Bibliography

External links
 Bachelor Lake Topo Map in Brown County MN
 Bachelor Lake Topographic map
 Minnesota DNR "Lakefinder" entry for Bachelor Lake, with links for
 water level;
 lake and stream water quality assessment information, including
 water quality summary; and
 list of plant species.

Lakes of Minnesota
Lakes of Brown County, Minnesota